Sigera is a Sinhalese surname derived from the Portuguese Siqueira. Notable people with the surname include:

Asel Sigera (born 1999), Sri Lankan cricketer
G. L. Sigera, Sri Lankan general
Hiruna Sigera (born 1999), Sri Lankan cricketer

Sinhalese surnames